Christa Kinshofer-Rembeck (formerly: Christa Kinshofer; ; born 24 January 1961) is a German former alpine ski racer and businesswoman. In her career she won three Olympic medals, one World Championship medal and seven World Cup races.

Biography 
Christa Kinshofer was born as daughter of Alfred and Maria Kinshofer in Munich. She grew up with three brothers and sisters in the Bavarian town Miesbach, where the parents were running a successful engineering company. As a child she also competed in figure skating. In 1966 she became member of SC Miesbach. With figure skating, she was "Kids Champion" in Munich at the age of 8. She concentrated already as a child on alpine ski races. From 1971 on, she participated inraces, whilst attending high school in Berchtesgaden.  She was West German youth champion several times. She scored her first World Cup points in the 1977 season with a tenth place in slalom. Her breakthrough came in the 1979 season, when she won 5 World Cup giant slaloms in a row.

In 1979 Kinshofer was voted as Sportswoman of the year in West Germany. One year later she won the silver medal in slalom at the Olympic Games in Lake Placid. Kinshofer was lying in second position of the overall world cup when a serious accident, which resulted in a fracture in her right ankle, forced her to a break of 11 months. She fell out with the West German Ski Federation (DSV) because of different opinions about training methods, and was therefore forced to leave the DSV. At that point, she switched to the Dutch national ski team. Because of deprivation of all FIS World ranking list points, she had to start amongst the last startnumbers. (Nr.124)

Kinshofer's comeback started with the victory of the international German Championship, although she still started for the Netherlands. The DSV called the "Lost Daughter" back into the German national team, appreciating her achievements. She won the World Cup Slalom in Piancavallo and could qualify in 4 events for the 1988 Olympic Games in Calgary.

In 1988 in Calgary, she was even more successful: she won silver in the giant slalom and one day later bronze in slalom, both times behind Vreni Schneider. After that she retired from skiing. This decision was also based on an injury of the intervertebral disc. Because of her talent, to sell and articulate in front of camera, she was offered several advertising contracts. During her career, she was called "Glamour Girl" and "Hollywood Christa" by the media.

Later careers 

After her skiing career, Kinshofer worked as a TV commentator for multiple sport channels and as an expert with the Bild magazine. She opened a sportshop for kids in Munich. Together with her sister she founded the company Kinsi Sports.

In 2001 she became a book writer ("Fit for success 2001"), followed by the autobiography "Helden werden nicht gewürfelt" in 2010. She works as a motivational trainer and international keynote speaker in the area of sports marketing and sponsoring. She organises golf yournaments and ski/snow events. Additionally, she stands up as a guide for kids and young persons with the foundation "Laureus Sport for Good" In 2005 she was involved in the opening of SkiDubai. Kinshofer is married since 2009 with the orthopedist  Dr. med. Erich Rembeck. Christa Kinshofer has twin daughters, born in 1992, from her first marriage. Since November 2012, she runs together with her husband the Christa Kinshofer Skiclinic in Munich.

World Cup victories

Overall victories

Individual victories

Europa Cup results
Kinshofer, representing Holland in that season for differences with the German federation, has won an overall Europa Cup and two specialty standings.

FIS Alpine Ski Europa Cup
Overall: 1987
Giant slalom: 1987
Super-G: 1987

References

External links
 
 

1961 births
Living people
German female alpine skiers
Olympic alpine skiers of West Germany
Alpine skiers at the 1980 Winter Olympics
Alpine skiers at the 1988 Winter Olympics
Olympic silver medalists for West Germany
Olympic bronze medalists for West Germany
Olympic medalists in alpine skiing
FIS Alpine Ski World Cup champions
Medalists at the 1988 Winter Olympics
Medalists at the 1980 Winter Olympics